Himno a Tlaxcala is the official anthem of the Mexican state of Tlaxcala. The music and lyrics were created by Carlos Cea y Díaz.

Lyrics

References 

Tlaxcala
Tlaxcala